Antonio Johnson (born October 29, 2001) is an American football safety for the Texas A&M Aggies.

High school career
Johnson attended East St. Louis Senior High School in East St. Louis, Illinois. He was selected to play in the 2020 All-American Bowl. A four-star prospect, he committed to play college football at Texas A&M University.

College career
Johnson played in seven games and made one start as a true freshman at Texas A&M in 2020, recording 14 tackles. As a sophomore in 2021, he started all 12 games and had 79 tackles, an interception, and a sack and was named a member of the All-SEC second team.

References

External links

Texas A&M Aggies bio

Living people
Sportspeople from East St. Louis, Illinois
Players of American football from Illinois
American football safeties
American football cornerbacks
Texas A&M Aggies football players
2001 births